Shahnawaz may refer to:

Begum Jahanara Shahnawaz (1896–1979), politician in British India and in Pakistan
Mumtaz Shahnawaz (1912–1948), Pakistani diplomat and writer
Shahnawaz Bhutto (1958–1985), the son of Zulfiqar Ali Bhutto and Begum Nusrat Bhutto
Shahnawaz Tanai (1950–2022), former Afghan communist general and politician
Syed Shahnawaz Hussain, former Indian federal minister and a politician of the Bharatiya Janata Party